Eylembilim is Oğuz Atay's last, unfinished, novel. It is about incidents that happen in a university, from the viewpoint of a professor.

40 pages of "Eylembilim" were found after Atay's death in 1977 and published in his book Günlük without any changes in 1987. 11 years after his death, a packet was sent to his daughter, Özge Atay, containing 74 more pages of this his last work, which was re-published with all extant pages under the title Eylembilim in 1998.

Sources
Iletisim.com.tr Eylembilim 
Sol Portal: review of Eylembilim, 14 April 2010 

1987 novels
1998 novels
Novels by Oğuz Atay
Unfinished novels
Novels published posthumously